Jaka Ihbeisheh (born 29 August 1986) is a retired Palestinian professional footballer.

International career
In 2014, Ihbeisheh made his debut for the Palestinian national team. He was included in the Palestinian squad for the 2015 AFC Asian Cup and scored the nation's first ever Asian Cup goal, during a 5–1 defeat against Jordan in the group stage.

International goals
Scores and results list Palestine's goal tally first, score column indicates score after each Ihbeisheh goal.

Personal life
Ihbeisheh was born in Ljubljana to a Palestinian father and Slovenian mother and raised in Slovenia. After his family separated when he was three years old, he only reconnected with his father, in Ramallah, 18 years later through Facebook.

References

1986 births
Living people
Footballers from Ljubljana
Slovenian footballers
Palestinian footballers
Palestine international footballers
Palestinian people of Slovenian descent
Slovenian people of Palestinian descent
Association football midfielders
Association football fullbacks
NK IB 1975 Ljubljana players
NK Svoboda Ljubljana players
NK Krka players
NK Aluminij players
NK Krško players
NK Primorje players
NK Rudar Velenje players
NK Domžale players
Al-Shamal SC players
Jaka Ihbeisheh
SV Stegersbach players
NK Bravo players
NK Radomlje players
Slovenian Second League players
Slovenian PrvaLiga players
Qatari Second Division players
Jaka Ihbeisheh
Palestinian expatriate footballers
Expatriate footballers in Qatar
Expatriate footballers in Thailand
Expatriate footballers in Austria
Palestinian expatriates in Austria
2015 AFC Asian Cup players
2019 AFC Asian Cup players